There are a number of ring roads found in South Africa.

List Of Ring Roads

See also 
 Johannesburg Ring Road
 Cape Town Ring Road
 Durban Ring Road
 Pretoria Ring Road
 Bloemfontein Ring Road
 Polokwane Ring Road

References 

Ring roads in South Africa